The names for chemical elements in East Asian languages, along with those for some chemical compounds (mostly organic), are among the newest words to enter the local vocabularies. Except for those metals well-known since antiquity, the names of most elements were created after modern chemistry was introduced to East Asia in the 18th and 19th century, with more translations being coined for those elements discovered later.

While most East Asian languages use—or have used—the Chinese script, only the Chinese language uses logograms as the predominant way of naming elements. Native phonetic writing systems are primarily used for element names in  Japanese (Katakana), Korean (Hangul) and Vietnamese (chữ Quốc ngữ).

Chinese 
In Chinese, characters for the elements are the last officially created and recognized characters in the Chinese writing system. Unlike characters for unofficial varieties of Chinese (e.g., written Cantonese) or other now-defunct ad hoc characters (e.g., those by the Empress Wu), the names for the elements are official, consistent, and taught (with Mandarin pronunciation) to every Chinese and Taiwanese student who has attended public schools (usually by the first year of middle school). New names and symbols are decided upon by the China National Committee for Terminology in Science and Technology.

Native characters 
Some metallic elements were already familiar to the Chinese, as their ores were already excavated and used extensively in China for construction, alchemy, and medicine. These include the long-established group of "Five Metals" (五金) — gold (金), silver (銀/银), copper (銅/铜), iron (鐵/铁), and tin (錫/锡) — as well as lead (鉛/铅) and mercury (汞).

Some non-metals were already named in Chinese as well, because their minerals were in widespread use. For example,
 boron (硼) as part of borax
 carbon (碳) in the form of charcoal
 sulfur (硫) had been used to make gunpowder since at least the 10th century in China.

Characters based on European pronunciations 
However, the Chinese did not know about most of the elements until they were isolated during the Industrial Age. These new elements therefore required new characters, which were invented using the phono-semantic principle. Each character consists of two parts, one to signify the meaning and the other to hint at the sound:

The semantic (meaning) part is also the radical of the character. It refers to the element's usual state at room temperature and standard pressure.

The phonetic (sound) part represents the character's pronunciation and is a partial transliteration of the element. For each element character, this is a unique phonetic component. Since 118 elements have been discovered, over 100 phonetic components are used in naming the elements.  Because many characters in modern Chinese are homophones, including for tone, two different phonetic components can be pronounced the same.  Current practice dictates that new names should avoid being homophonous with previous element names or with organic functional groups.  However, this rule was not rigorously followed in the past, and confusingly, the names of tin (锡) and selenium (硒) are pronounced the same, including tone, as xī in Mainland China. (In Taiwan tin is xí while selenium is xī.)

锡 (tin) and 硒 (selenium) are not homophones in Nanjing Mandarin, which was the prestige dialect of Chinese when most elements were named, which was until the late 19th century. The phonetic component of 锡, 易 (yì), was accurate when the character was invented around 3000 years ago, but not now because of sound change. In Middle Chinese 锡 was an entering tone character, a closed syllable ending in -p/-t/-k (or -ʔ in some modern dialects). But 硒 was constructed in the late 19th century using the (still accurate) phonetic 西 (xī), which in Middle Chinese was a level tone character, an open syllable with a vowel ending.  In Beijing Mandarin, the variety on which Standard Modern Chinese is based, stop consonant endings of syllables were dropped, and the entering tone was merged into the other tones in a complex and irregular manner by the 16th–17th centuries, and 锡 and 西 both became Tone 1 (high tone) characters.  In dialects that preserve the entering tone, like Nanjing Mandarin and Shanghainese and Cantonese, 锡 retains a -k or -ʔ ending and 锡 and 西 (硒) are pronounced differently.

This sometimes causes difficulty in verbal communication, as Sn and Se can both be divalent and tetravalent.  Thus, SnO2 二氧化锡 and SeO2 二氧化硒 are pronounced identically, as èryǎnghuàxī. To avoid further confusion, P.R.C. authorities avoided using the name 矽 xī (or any tonal variants) for silicon. (On Taiwan 矽 is pronounced xì.)

† / is primarily pronounced as nèi, but less commonly as nà, the source of /.
* The derived pronunciation differs (in tone or in sound) from the pronunciation of the element.

The "water" radical is not used much here, as only two elements (bromine and mercury) are truly liquid at standard room temperature and pressure. Their characters are not based on the European pronunciation of the elements' names. Bromine, the only liquid nonmetal at room temperature, is explained in the following section. Mercury, now grouped with the heavy metals, was long classified as a kind of fluid in ancient China.

Meaning-based characters 
A few characters, though, are not created using the above "phono-semantic" design, but are "semantic-semantic", that is, both of its parts indicate meanings. One part refers to the element's usual state (like the semanto-phonetic characters), while the other part indicates some additional property or function of the element. In addition, the second part also indicates the pronunciation of the element. Such elements are:

Usage in the nomenclature for simple inorganic compounds 
Simple covalent binary inorganic compounds EmXn are named as 

 n X 化 (huà) m E   (with n and m written as Chinese numerals),

where X is more electronegative than E, using the IUPAC formal electronegativity order.  化 as a full noun or verb means 'change; transform(ation)'.  As a noun suffix, it is equivalent to the English suffixes -ized/-ated/-ified. It is the root of the word 化学 (huàxué) 'chemistry'.

For example, P4S10 is called 十硫化四磷 (shíliúhuàsìlín) (literally: 'ten sulfur of four phosphorus', 'decasulfide of tetraphosphorus').  As in English nomenclature, if m = 1, the numerical prefix of E is usually dropped in covalent compounds.  For example, CO is called 一氧化碳 (yīyǎnghuàtàn) (literally: 'one oxygen of carbon', 'monoxide of carbon').  

However, for compounds named as salts, numerical prefixes are dropped altogether, as in English. Thus, calcium chloride, CaCl2, is named 氯化钙 (literally: 'chloride of calcium'). The Chinese name for FeCl3, 氯化铁, literally means 'chlorinated iron' and is akin to the archaic English names 'muriated iron' or 'muriate of iron'. In this example, 氯 is 'chlorine' and 铁 is 'iron'.

There is a Chinese analog of the -ic/-ous nomenclature for higher/lower oxidation states: -ous is translated as 亚 (yà, 'minor; secondary'): for example, FeCl2 is 氯化亚铁 and FeCl3 is 氯化铁.  In a four-way contrast, hypo- is translated as 次 (cì, 'inferior; following') and per- is translated as 高 (gāo, 'high, upper').  For example, the acid HClO is 次氯酸 "inferior chlorine acid", HClO2 is 亚氯酸, HClO3 is 氯酸, and HClO4 is 高氯酸.  In this example, the character 酸 (suān, 'sour') means (organic or inorganic) acid.  The more modern Stock nomenclature in which oxidation state is explicitly specified can also be used: thus, tin(IV) oxide (SnO2) is simply 氧化锡(IV).

Recently discovered elements 

In 2015, IUPAC recognised the discovery of four new elements. In November 2016, IUPAC published their formal names and symbols: nihonium (113Nh), moscovium (115Mc), tennessine (117Ts), and  oganesson (118Og).

Subsequently, in January 2017, the China National Committee for Terms in Sciences and Technologies published four naming characters for these elements. The National Academy for Educational Research under the Ministry of Education of the Republic of China on Taiwan published an almost identical list (the only differences being the use of the traditional Chinese metal radical '釒' in place of the simplified Chinese form '钅' for nihonium and moscovium) in April 2017. 

For traditional Chinese, nihonium and moscovium were then existing characters; while in simplified Chinese, only moscovium already existed in the Unicode Standard. The missing characters were added to Unicode version 11.0 as urgently-needed characters in June 2018.

The Chinese characters for these symbols are:
 Nihonium: Traditional:  Simplfied:   (nǐ)
 Moscovium: Traditional:  Simplfied:  (mò)
 Tennessine: Both Traditional and Simplfied:   (tián)
 Oganesson: Both Traditional and Simplfied:   (ào)

In the periodic table 

Pronunciations for some elements differ between Mainland China and Taiwan, as described in the article. Simplified characters and Mainland Chinese pronunciations are shown above. Some of the characters for the superheavy elements may not be visible depending on fonts.

Notes 

A minority of the "new characters" are not completely new inventions, as they coincide with archaic characters, whose original meanings have long been lost to most people. For example, 鈹 (beryllium), 鉻 (chromium), 鑭 (lanthanum), and 鏷 (protactinium), are obscure characters meaning "needle", "hook", "harrow", and "raw iron", respectively.

The majority of the elements' names are the same in Simplified Chinese and Traditional Chinese, merely being variants of each other, since most of the names were translated by a single body of standardization before the PRC-ROC split. However, since francium and the transuranium elements were discovered during or after the split, they have different names in Taiwan and in Mainland China. In Hong Kong, both Taiwanese and Mainland Chinese names are used. A few pronunciations also differ even when the characters are analogous: cobalt gǔ (PRC) / gū (ROC); palladium bǎ (PRC) / bā (ROC); tin xī (PRC) / xí (ROC); antimony tī (PRC) / tì (ROC); polonium pō (PRC) / pò (ROC); uranium yóu (PRC) / yòu (ROC); bohrium bō (PRC) / pō (ROC).

The isotopes of hydrogen – protium (1H), deuterium (D) and tritium (T) – are written 氕 piē, 氘 dāo and 氚 chuān, respectively, in both simplified and traditional writing.
鑀 is used in Taiwan for both einsteinium (mainland China: 锿) and ionium, a previous name for the isotope thorium-230.

Japanese 
Like other words in the language, elements' names in Japanese can be native, from China (Sino-Japanese) or from Europe (gairaigo).

Names based on European pronunciations 
Even though the Japanese language also uses Chinese characters (kanji), it primarily employs katakana to transliterate names of the elements from European languages (often German/Dutch or Latin [via German] or English). For example,

Native names 
On the other hand, elements known since antiquity are Chinese loanwords, which are mostly identical to their Chinese counterparts, albeit in the Shinjitai, for example, iron is tetsu (Tang-dynasty loan) and lead is namari (native reading). While all elements in Chinese are single-character in the official system, some Japanese elements have two characters. Often this parallels colloquial or everyday names for such elements in Chinese, such as 水銀/水银 for mercury and 硫黃/硫黄 for sulfur. A special case is tin (suzu), which is more often written in katakana.

Meaning-based names 
Some names were later invented to describe properties or characteristics of the element. 
They were mostly introduced around the 18th century to Japan, and they sometimes differ drastically from their Chinese counterparts. The following comparison shows that Japanese does not use the radical system for naming elements like Chinese.

Korean 
As Hanja (Sino-Korean characters) are now rarely used in Korea, all of the elements are written in Hangul.
Since many Korean scientific terms were translated from Japanese sources, the pattern of naming is mostly similar to that of Japanese. Namely, the classical elements are loanwords from China, with new elements from European languages. But recently, some elements' names were changed. For example:

Pre-modern (18th-century) elements often are the Korean pronunciation of their Japanese equivalents, e.g.,

Vietnamese 
Others have native or old Sino-Vietnamese names, such as sắt for iron, bạc for silver, chì for lead, vàng for gold, kền for nickel (niken is the more common name) and kẽm for zinc. 
In either case, now they are written in the Vietnamese alphabet.

The majority of elements are shortened and localized pronunciations of the European names (usually from French). For example:
 Phosphorus becomes phốtpho.
 The -ine suffix is absent, e.g., chlorine, iodine and fluorine become clo, iốt and flo, respectively; compare French chlore, iode, fluor.
  The -um suffix is lost, e.g., caesium becomes xêzi, pronounced ; compare the French césium, pronounced  (whereas the English is ).
 Similarly, beryllium, tellurium, lithium, natrium (sodium), and lanthanum become berili, telua, liti, natri, and lantan respectively
 The -gen suffix is lost, e.g., nitrogen, oxygen and hydrogen become nitơ, ôxy and hiđrô, respectively

A minority of elements, mostly those not suffixed with -ium, retain their full name, e.g.,
 Tungsten (aka wolfram) becomes volfram.
 Bismuth becomes bitmut.
 Aluminium becomes nhôm, because the ending -nium has a similar pronunciation. It was the first element to be known in English in Vietnam.
 Elements with the -on suffix (e.g. noble gases)  seem to be inconsistent. Boron and silicon are respectively shortened to bo and silic. On the other hand, neon, argon, krypton, xenon and radon do not have common shorter forms.
 Unlike the other halogens, astatine retains its suffix (astatin in Vietnamese).
 Antimony is shortened to antimon, and arsenic to asen; these names are similar to the German ones (Antimon and Arsen, respectively).

Some elements have multiple names, for instance, potassium is known as pô-tát and kali (from kalium, the element's Latin name).

See also 
Discoveries of the chemical elements
Organic nomenclature in Chinese

References 

Wright, David (2000). Translating Science: The Transmission of Western Chemistry into Late Imperial China, 1840–1900. Leiden; Boston: Brill. See especially Chapter Seven, "On Translation".

External links

Periodic tables 
 Interactive table in Traditional Chinese
 Interactive table in Simplified Chinese
 Interactive table in Japanese
 Interactive table in Korean
 Interactive table in Vietnamese
 English-Chinese periodic table of elements

Articles 
 The Chinese Periodic Table: A Rosetta Stone for Understanding the Language of Chemistry in the Context of the Introduction of Modern Chemistry into China
 A New Inquiry into the Translation of Chemical Terms by John Fryer and Xu Shou
 Chinese Terms for Chemical Elements

East Asian languages
Languages of East Asia
Periodic table
Science and technology in East Asia